Megha Gupta is an Indian television actress and model.

Career 
Gupta has appeared in television serials such as Kkavyanjali, Kumkum – Ek Pyara Sa Bandhan, Mamta, C.I.D., MTV Big F, and Main Teri Parchhain Hoon. She entered Nach Baliye 4 with Naman Shaw and was a runner-up. Gupta has also appeared in Yeh Hai Aashiqui and Pyaar Tune Kya Kiya in August 2014.

Personal life 
Gupta's sister Additi Gupta is also a television actress.

Gupta was married to Aditya Shroff, owner of Fame Cinemas. In August 2016, she married Ek Tha Raja Ek Thi Rani actor Siddhant Karnick.

Filmography

Television

Filmography

References

External links 
 

Living people
Female models from Mumbai
Actresses from Mumbai
Indian television actresses
Actresses in Hindi television
21st-century Indian actresses
Year of birth missing (living people)